Ošve is a village in the municipality of Maglaj, Bosnia and Herzegovina.
Prior the war, the village was predominantly inhabited by the Serbs, however the Serb population was entirely expelled during the war.

Demographics 
According to the 2013 census, its population was 80.

References

Populated places in Maglaj